Calamotropa is a genus of snout moths. It was described by George Hampson in 1918 and contains the species Calamotropa pulverivena. It is found in Western Australia.

References

Anerastiini
Monotypic moth genera
Moths of Australia
Pyralidae genera